FC Orbita Minsk is a Belarusian football club based in Minsk.

History
Orbita played in the Belarusian SSR league from 1974 to 1991. The most successful season was 1984, when the team won the league. In 1992 the team played in Belarusian First League, but withdrew to amateur level the next year. One more attempt to play at the professional level was made in 2000 when the team played in the Belarusian Second League, but the next year Orbita withdrew again. Nowadays Orbita only has a youth team which participates in the youth Minsk Championspip.

League and Cup history

Association football clubs established in 1974
1974 establishments in Belarus